Georgetown-St. Peters was a provincial electoral district for the Legislative Assembly of Prince Edward Island, Canada. It was created from mostly 3rd Kings and part of 5th Kings. The district was named Georgetown-Baldwin's Road from 1996 to 2007.

Members
The riding has elected the following Members of the Legislative Assembly:

Election results

Georgetown-St. Peters, 2007–2019

2016 electoral reform plebiscite results

Georgetown-Baldwin's Road, 1996–2007

References

 Georgetown-St. Peters information

Former provincial electoral districts of Prince Edward Island